The 2011–12 Liga Nacional de Hockey Hielo season was the 38th season of the Liga Nacional de Hockey Hielo, the top level of ice hockey in Spain. Six teams participated in the league, and CH Jaca won the championship.

Regular season

Playoffs

Semifinals 
 CH Jaca - CH Txuri Urdin 2:1 (3:4 OT, 7:0, 5:3)
 CG Puigcerdà - FC Barcelona 2:0 (4:1, 5:2)

Final 
 CH Jaca - CG Puigcerdà 3:1 (8:7, 5:1, 1:4, 4:2)

External links
 Official website

Spain
Liga Nacional de Hockey Hielo seasons
Liga